The Department for Professional Employees, AFL–CIO (DPE) is a semi-autonomous "trade" department of the AFL–CIO, and serves as an advocate for professional workers within the federation, and before legislative bodies, the press and the public.

Founding
The 1960s saw a significant increase in the number of professional workers joining labor unions in the United States. In 1962, President John F. Kennedy granted collective bargaining rights to federal workers. Unions such as the American Federation of State, County and Municipal Employees, American Federation of Government Employees, American Postal Workers Union, National Association of Letter Carriers, American Federation of Teachers, Service Employees International Union, National Education Association and American Nurses Association added hundreds of thousands of new members in only a few years. The number of professionals also grew phenomenally: By 1977, there were 13.9 million professional workers in the U.S.

The fast-growing professional and public employee unions of the AFL–CIO pushed for a more effective voice within the federation. In 1967, the Council for Scientific Professional and Cultural Employees (SPACE), affiliated with the AFL–CIO, was formed. In 1974, it was renamed the Council for Professional Employees (CPE).

In 1977, the AFL–CIO constitution was amended to transform the council into the Department for Professional Employees. DPE's first president was Albert Shanker, president of the American Federation of Teachers.

Structure
As a semi-autonomous department of the AFL–CIO, the DPE has its own constitution, elects its own board of directors and officers, holds its own convention, makes policy, and sets dues. In many respects, it acts like a labor federation of its own.

DPE is governed by its affiliate unions. Membership in DPE is open to affiliate unions of the AFL–CIO. Currently, 23 national unions representing over four million workers belong to DPE. The member unions meet in a quadrennial convention (the last was in 2017), at which members elect a board of directors and officers, set dues, and discuss and approve policies. DPE members are free to establish their own policies and procedures so long as they do not conflict with the constitution and policies of the AFL–CIO.

DPE members elect three executive officers—a president, first vice president and treasurer, as well as nine individuals to a board of directors. One of the nine is elected as chair of the board. Between conventions, the board is the governing body of DPE. Day-to-day operations are overseen by the president.

Under the AFL–CIO constitution, DPE (as with all trade departments) has certain rights.  DPE officers are entitled to attend meetings of the AFL–CIO executive council as well as certain standing and policy committees of the council. DPE also may elect delegates to represent it at the AFL–CIO quadrennial convention, and its delegates may participate in the convention's committees. As a matter of courtesy and AFL–CIO policy, DPE officers are also invited to participate in the activities of a wide variety of AFL–CIO councils, committees, policy-making groups, and staff and departmental meetings.

DPE is one of six constitutional departments of the AFL–CIO, which means that it may not be abolished without amending the AFL–CIO's constitution.

Currently, the chair of the DPE general board is Paul Shearon, International President of the International Federation of Professional and Technical Engineers. The first vice president is David White, National Executive Director of SAG-AFTRA. The treasurer is Lorretta Johnson, Secretary-Treasurer of the American Federation of Teachers.

DPE's president is Jennifer Dorning.

Special programs
In 2004, DPE established a Committee on the Evolution of Professional Careers. Nearly 20 national unions agreed to delegate members, staff and resources to the committee, which identified and analyzed trends affecting the future of white-collar work, identified the fastest-growing white-collar professions, identified the best strategies to organize these workers; and identified or developed new models of unions or professional association which would allow unions to expand membership in these professions.

In 2005, DPE held its first-ever organizing conference, "Organizing Professionals in the 21st Century."

Presidents
1977: Albert Shanker
1979?: Jack Golodner
1990s: Morton Bahr
2001: Paul Almeida
2018: Jennifer Dorning

References
Aronson, Robert L. "Unionism Among Professional Employees in the Private Sector." Industrial and Labor Relations Review. 38:3 (April 1985).
Department for Professional Employees, AFL–CIO. Program, Activities and Achievements, 2001-2005. Washington, D.C., 2005.
Dewar, Helen. "AFL-CIO Plans to Increase Levy on Membership." Washington Post. December 8, 1977.
Grossfeld, Jim and Lake, Celinda. "A Union Hearing: A Retooled Approach to Discussing Organized Labor Would Resonate With Insecure White Collar Workers." The American Prospect. December 19, 2006.
Maher, Kris. "White-Collar Workers Turn to Unions for Support." Charleston Gazette. October 2, 2005.
Shear, Michael D. "Labor Labels Senate Hopeful 'Anti-Worker'." Washington Post. April 14, 2006.
"Unions Launch Network to Examine Issues of Concern to Professionals." Daily Labor Report. October 24, 2002.
Von Bergen, Jane M. "A Judge in a Union?" Philadelphia Inquirer. March 27, 2005.
"Writers Guild Votes." New York Times. May 12, 1989.

External links
Department for Professional Employees

1977 establishments in Washington, D.C.
AFL–CIO
Trade unions established in 1977
Trade unions in the United States